Lake Asnacocha (possibly from Quechua asna, asnaq foul-smelling, stinking, qucha lake) is a lake in Peru located in the Cusco Region, Acomayo Province, Mosoc Llacta District. It is situated southeast of Lake Pomacanchi.

References 

Lakes of Peru
Lakes of Cusco Region